The 1965 Baylor Bears football team represented Baylor University in the Southwest Conference (SWC) during the 1965 NCAA University Division football season. In their seventh season under head coach John Bridgers, the Bears compiled a 5–5 record (3–4 against conference opponents), tied for fourth place in the conference, and were outscored by opponents by a combined total of 171 to 156. They played their home games at Baylor Stadium in Waco, Texas.

The team's statistical leaders included Ken Stockdale with 978 passing yards, Richard Defee with 429 rushing yards, Harlan Lane with 643 receiving yards, and Billy Hayes and George Cheshire with 24 points scored each. Mike V. Bourland and Bill Ferguson were the team captains.

Schedule

References

Baylor
Baylor Bears football seasons
Baylor Bears football